Lelde Gasūna (born 17 September 1990) is a Latvian alpine skier. She was born in Sigulda. She competed at the 2014 Winter Olympics in Sochi, in  giant slalom and slalom.

References

External links

1990 births
Living people
Alpine skiers at the 2014 Winter Olympics
Alpine skiers at the 2018 Winter Olympics
Latvian female alpine skiers
Olympic alpine skiers of Latvia
21st-century Latvian women